Big Girls Don't Cry is a 2002 German drama film. Written and directed by Maria von Heland, it tells the story of two teenage girls in Berlin, one of whom takes revenge on the daughter of her father's lover. A subplot involves a third girl who drifts into pornography and comes to a bad end. As part of the coming of age tale, the girls lose their virginity and use drugs.

Plot
Kati and Steffi, inseparable since childhood, are teenagers at school. Kati endures a modest and difficult home life with a neurotic mother but Steffi's family are well off and harmonious. Everything changes when in a night club the two see Steffi's father entwined with another woman. Furious at this treachery, Steffi plots revenge against the woman's daughter Tessa. First she sends the girl to audition for a band, but it emerges that she can sing well and the band like her. That having failed, Steffi sends her to a pornographer, having got the address from a schoolmate Yvonne, who posed to earn some money so that she could leave home. Kati gets worried over Steffi's obsessive behaviour and, tracking down Tessa, rescues her as the pornographer tries to rape her, then reveals why Steffi had sent her to him.

Furious after Tessa tells her, Tessa's mother storms round to the home of Steffi's parents and tells them what's been going on, upon which Steffi's mother leaves home. In the meantime, a nationwide police search has been launched for the missing Yvonne. Suspecting the pornographer, Kati recounts all she knows to the police, who tell her Yvonne has in fact been murdered. Going to see Steffi, she tells her that it was she who saved Tessa and so triggered the crisis in Steffi's family. When Steffi does not appear at school next day, Kati breaks into her home to find she has slashed both wrists. By calling an ambulance, Kati saves her life and at the hospital Steffi's parents turn up, apparently reconciled. Kati's mother at last shows sympathy towards her daughter and in a final shot the recovering Steffi makes it up with Kati.

Cast

External links 

2002 films
2000s German-language films
Films set in Berlin
German teen drama films
2000s teen drama films
2002 drama films
2000s German films